This is a list of commanders of the Grand Cross of the Order of the White Rose of Finland. Living Commanders are in bold and foreign Commanders are on blue background.

The Grand Cross can be awarded with a Collar.

Sources
Suomen Valkoisen Ruusun ritarikunnan suurristin ketjuineen ulkomaalaiset saajat (in Finnish)
Korkeimpien suomalaisten kunniamerkkien haltijat 1918–1969 (in Finnish)

Further reading